is a Japanese manga series by Momoko Kouda. Sensei Kunshu was serialized in the monthly  manga magazine Bessatsu Margaret from July 13, 2013 to June 13, 2017. A live-action film adaptation of the same name was released on August 1, 2018.

Plot

Ayuha Samaru, a straightforward, hardworking high school student, falls in love with Yoshitaka Hiromitsu, who helps her out one day at a restaurant. The next day, she discovers that Mr. Hiromitsu is a new substitute teacher filling in for her homeroom teacher at school. Ayuha believes that she and Mr. Hiromitsu are destined to become lovers and decides to persistently pursue him romantically.

Characters

; portrayed by: Minami Hamabe (film)

; portrayed by: Ryoma Takeuchi (film)
Mr. Hiromitsu is the older brother of Kosuke Hiromitsu, a character from Kouda's previous work, Heroine Shikkaku.

; portrayed by: Taiki Sato (film)

Media

Manga

Sensei Kunshu is written and illustrated by Momoko Kouda. It was serialized in the monthly  manga magazine Bessatsu Margaret from the June 2013 issue released on July 13, 2013 to the May 2017 issue released on June 13, 2017. The chapters were later released in 13 bound volumes by Shueisha under the Margaret Comics imprint.

During the series' run, Shueisha released a vomic (voice comic) starring Rumi Okubo and Junichi Suwabe.

Film

In January 2018, Bessatsu Margaret announced that a live-action film adaptation was green-lit, with a release date of August 1, 2018 later revealed in April of that year. Exile and Fantastics member Taiki Sato, Rina Kawaei, Yua Shinkawa, and Riko Fukumoto were announced as additional cast members in March 2017. The film's theme song is a cover of "I Want You Back" performed by Twice. A second version of the music video featuring the cast of the film dancing with Twice was released on June 26, 2018. The film is also titled My Teacher, My Love for international markets.

The Blu-ray deluxe edition sold a cumulative total of 3,097 copies in its first week and debuted at #15 on the Oricon Weekly Blu-ray Charts. The DVD deluxe edition sold a cumulative total of 2,695 copies in its first week and debuted at #11 on the Oricon Weekly DVD Charts, while the regular edition debuted at #29 and sold 1,389 copies.

Reception

For the live-action film adaptation, Mark Schilling from The Japan Times gave the film 2 out of 5 stars, stating his discomfort at Ayuha and Mr. Hiromitsu's relationship as student and teacher. In his review, he noted that student-teacher romances with dim-witted heroines were still vastly common in Japan compared to the West. He also stated that Ayuha's character was far more realistic in the manga than the film.

References

External links
  
 Official movie website 

Live-action films based on manga
Manga adapted into films
Shōjo manga
Shueisha manga
Japanese romantic comedy films